Neocyclotus is a genus of gastropods belonging to the family Neocyclotidae.

The species of this genus are found in America.

Species:

Neocyclotus agassizi 
Neocyclotus aulari 
Neocyclotus bisinuatus 
Neocyclotus burringtoni 
Neocyclotus capscelius 
Neocyclotus carabobensis 
Neocyclotus cayennensis 
Neocyclotus chrysacme 
Neocyclotus connivens 
Neocyclotus corpulentus 
Neocyclotus corrugatus 
Neocyclotus distinctus 
Neocyclotus duffianus 
Neocyclotus dysoni 
Neocyclotus glaucostomus 
Neocyclotus granadensis 
Neocyclotus granulatus 
Neocyclotus haematomma 
Neocyclotus kugleri 
Neocyclotus limellus 
Neocyclotus panamensis 
Neocyclotus peilei 
Neocyclotus prominulus 
Neocyclotus quitensis 
Neocyclotus rugatus 
Neocyclotus sanctamarthae 
Neocyclotus simplicostus 
Neocyclotus smithi 
Neocyclotus stramineus 
Neocyclotus vincentinus 
Neocyclotus wetmorei

References

Gastropods